A School Outing is a 1983 Italian comedy-drama film written and directed by Pupi Avati. It entered the 40° Venice Film Festival. The film won the Nastro d'Argento Awards for Best Director, Best Score, Best Actor, Best New Actress and Best Original Script.

Plot   
An old lady recalls the most beautiful memory of her life: a school trip from Bologna to Florence, through the Apennines, on the eve of graduation exam in the early twentieth century. The thirty boys are accompanied by the teacher of letters and drawing. The latter will have a love affair with one of the pupils. But the professor, in love with her, will defend her from scandal.

Cast 
Giancarlo Torri: Augusto Baldi
Tiziana Pini:  Professor Serena Stanzani 
Carlo Delle Piane: Professor Balla
Lidia Broccolino: Laura  
Rossana Casale: Rossana
Nik Novecento		
Bob Messini

See also    
 List of Italian films of 1983

References

External links

1983 films
Italian comedy-drama films
Films directed by Pupi Avati
Films scored by Riz Ortolani
1983 comedy-drama films
1980s Italian-language films
1980s Italian films